Uhlemann is a surname of German origin that may refer to:

Detlef Uhlemann (born 1949), former West German distance runner
Friedrich Gottlob Uhlemann (1792–1864), German theologian and writer
Max Uhlemann (died 1862), German Egyptologist

See also
Uhlmann

German-language surnames